Alone at Last is the first solo album by vibraphonist Gary Burton, on which he also plays piano and organ. It was recorded in 1971, and features three performances from the Montreux Jazz Festival and four performances from the studio. It released on the Atlantic label in 1972. The album was awarded a Grammy for Best Jazz Performance by a Soloist at the 15th Grammy Awards.

Reception 
The Allmusic review by Scott Yanow awarded the album 5 stars, calling it, "one of the high points of Gary Burton's career. Wondrous music".

Track listing
 "Moonchild/In Your Quiet Place" (Keith Jarrett) - 6:14
 "Green Mountains/Arise, Her Eyes" (Steve Swallow) - 7:35 
 "The Sunset Bell" (Gary Burton) - 5:09 
 "Handbags and Gladrags" (Mike d'Abo) - 6:05 
 "Hullo Bolinas" (Swallow) - 5:49 
 "General Mojo's Well Laid Plan" (Swallow) - 3:38 
 "Chega de Saudade (No More Blues)" (Vinícius de Moraes, Antônio Carlos Jobim) - 4:39 
Songs 1-3 recorded at the Montreux Jazz Festival, Montreux, Switzerland on June 19, 1971.

Songs 4-7 recorded at Atlantic Recording Studios, New York, NY on September 7, 1971.

Personnel 
 Gary Burton — vibraphone, piano, organ

References 

Atlantic Records albums
Gary Burton albums
1972 albums
Albums produced by Joel Dorn
Albums recorded at the Montreux Jazz Festival